Khaled bin Sinan al-`Absi was a revered figure and judge by profession of pre-Islamic Arabia belonging to the Hunafa, who is thought to have lived in the region of Najd of the ancient historical region of Al-Yamama around AD 520-588, sometime between the 1st and 7th century CE. 

Khalid bin Sinan Al-Absi is a judge and writer of Arab writers and their sages, and he was passionate about the religion of Abraham, calling for the renunciation of idols, wine and usury.

Historical accounts narrate that he was one of a line of prophets sent to the Arab peoples, beginning with Ismā'īl and ending with Muhammad.

Ancestry 
His ancestry is linked to the clan of Banu 'Abs, descendants of ʿAbs ibn Baghīd ibn Rayth ibn Ghaṭafān, to the tribe of Ghatafan:

"Khalid bin Sinan bin Ghaith bin Maritah bin Makhzum bin Rabi'ah bin Aus bin Malik bin Ghalib bin Qutay'ah bin 'Abs bin Baghid bin Rayth bin Ghatafan"

خالد بن سنان بن غيث بن مريطة بن مخزوم بن ربيعة بن عوذ بن مالك بن غالب بن قطيعة بن عبس بن بغيض بن ريث بن غطفان

The Banu 'Abs are distant cousins of Muhammad, the final prophet of Islam, due to his direct descendant from the Arab ancestor Adnan, who were a group of Ishmaelite Arabs.

Biography 
Khaled was born in Al-Yamama 50 years before the Year of the Elephant, and learned to read and write at an early age, and he started calling on his people to unite and renounce idols, discard alcohol, usury, and the facilitator, so he took up the judiciary in Bani Abs, as he was a prominent Arab writer before the year of the elephant, and he used to go to literary clubs and markets In Yamama and the Hijaz.

Sayings between some writers and historians 
Some historians and narrators claimed that he was a prophet, and that Muhammad said: “That is a prophet who was lost by his people.” however, it is a weak hadith - from a weak source. 

In Majma al-Zawa'id, the scholar Nur al-Din Al-Haythami said, this (prior) hadith is against the authentic hadith which also is reported by Abu Hurairah in Sahih al-Bukhari: "the Messenger of Allah (SWS) said: "I am most akin (closest) to 'Isa ibn Maryam (Jesus, son of Mary), among the whole of mankind, and all the Prophets are of different mothers but belong to one religion and no Prophet was raised between me and Jesus."

Ibn Kathir said, "And He is more like that he was good, righteous man for circumstances and dignities."

Miscellaneous 
He should not be confused with the companion of Muhammad of the same name, "Khalid ibn Sinan al-Awsi", who fought in the Battle of Badr.

The name "Khaled" also appears in the supplication of Ummi Dawud by Ja'far al-Sadiq, the 6th Imam of Shia Islam, among a list of persons with whom the supplicant asks (God) to be blessed; most of whom appear in the Quran as prophets. It is believed that this is in reference to Khaled bin Sinan.

See also
 Prophets in Islam
 Hanifs

References
 Khaled the prophet, Farhad Ghorban Dordinejad. A brief biography.
 Regarding Khalid ibn Sinan. Commentary on subject's Prophethood.
 Du`a Umm Dawood. English translation of the historical accounts of the subject's life.

520 births
588 deaths
6th-century Arabs
Pre-Islamic Arabia